Carole Stanisière (born June 3, 1970 in Chamonix, Haute-Savoie) is a French cross-country skier who competed from 1992 to 1998. Competing in two Winter Olympics, she had her best career finish of fifth in the 4 × 5 km relay at Albertville in 1992 and her best individual finish of 24th in the 30 km event at Lillehammer in 1994.

At the FIS Nordic World Ski Championships, Stasinière had her best finish of 29th in the 5 km event at Falun in 1993. Her best World Cup finish was 29th in a 10 km event in Switzerland in 1993.

Stanisière's best individual career finish was third twice in 5 km Continental Cup events in 1995.

Cross-country skiing results
All results are sourced from the International Ski Federation (FIS).

Olympic Games

World Championships

World Cup

Season standings

References

External links

Women's 4 x 5 km cross-country relay Olympic results: 1976-2002 

1970 births
Cross-country skiers at the 1992 Winter Olympics
Cross-country skiers at the 1994 Winter Olympics
French female cross-country skiers
Living people
Olympic cross-country skiers of France
People from Chamonix
Sportspeople from Haute-Savoie
20th-century French women